Dennis Wayne DeVaughn (born October 28, 1960) is a former American football defensive back. He played for the Philadelphia Eagles from 1982 to 1983 and for the Houston Gamblers in 1985.

References

1960 births
Living people
Players of American football from Los Angeles
American football defensive backs
Bishop Tigers football players
Philadelphia Eagles players
Houston Gamblers players